The Tribhuvan Highway connects the outskirts of Kathmandu, the capital of Nepal, with Birganj/Raxaul on the Nepal-India border. NH 28 and NH 28A links Raxaul with Lucknow/Barauni and other locations in India.

History
It was named in memory of King Tribhuvan (1906–1955).

Its construction was completed with Indian assistance in 1956, and it provided the first serviceable road connection with India. The first regular daily bus service on the highway was operated by Nepal Transport Service in 1959. The bus route ended at the railway station at Amlekhganj, from where travellers took the Nepal Government Railway (NGR) the rest of the way to Birgunj and Raxaul.

Before Tribhuvan Highway was built, travelers used the historic trade route passing through Kulekhani, Chitlang, Chandragiri Pass and Thankot.

Route
The best stretch is through the Terai region. Thereafter, it is an unending series of climbs and descents through the Sivalik Hills north of Hetauda. At Naubise, the Tribhuwan Highway intersects the Prithvi Highway.

Daman on Tribhuvan Highway has probably the finest view of the Himalayas extending on a good day from Dhaulagiri in the west to Everest in the east.

Pathlaiya is the junction point of the Mahendra Highway and the Tribhuvan Highway.

Kathmandu-Terai Expressway alternative
There are at least half a dozen routes to the Terai region via Makawanpur from the capital city, including Tribhuvan Highway, Kanti Highway, Ganesh Man Road, and Madan Bhandari Road. The four-lane fast track extending from the outer ring road in Kathmandu to Nijgadh in the Terai region will be the shortest and will only be . The track will have a tunnel of 1.3 km at Thingana of Makawanpur. It has been under construction since 2008.

References

Highways in Nepal
History of transport in Nepal
1956 establishments in Nepal